2014 African Youth Games in Gaborone was held between 28 and 31 May at the Botswana National Stadium. The competition served as the qualification for the 2014 Summer Youth Olympics which took place in August in Nanjing, China.

Format
The boys' and girls' tournament will adopt a round robin group stage and a single-elimination medal round, where the 10 participating teams are split into 2 pools of 10. Each team will play once against the other teams in its pool, and the top 8 teams from each pool will qualify for the knock-out stages.

Boys

Girls
Note: Guam entered a girls' basketball team into Group B of the competition; there was no Guam boys' team at the tournament

Medal summary

Medal table

Results

References 

2014 African Youth Games